The Four Corners Tour was the tenth headlining concert tour by British pop rock band The Vamps. The tour began on 27 April 2019 in Plymouth and concluded on 1 June 2019 in Bournemouth.

Background and development
On 6 July 2018 The Vamps announced they would be headlining a United Kingdom and Ireland tour, with New Hope Club and Hrvy joining the group as openers. Taylor Grey was also announced as an opening act on select dates. Additional dates, including dates in Scotland, were later added.

Setlist 
This setlist is representative of the show on 29 May 2019 in Dublin. It does not represent all the shows from the tour.

"Just My Type"
"Personal"
"Wild Heart"
"For You"
"All The Lies"
"We Don't Care"
Drum solo
"Somebody to You"
"Waves"
"Middle of the Night"
"What Your Father Says"
"Right Now"
"Hair Too Long"
"Can We Dance"
"Wake Up"
Encore
 "Cheater"
"Risk It All"
"Missing You"
"All Night"

Tour dates

References

2019 concert tours